EUROMOBIL is an interactive multimedia language learning and information programme for nine European target languages. The EUROMOBIL project was launched in 1999 with the aim to support student mobility. EUROMOBIL has been designed with the support of the European Commission (Socrates/Lingua2). EUROMOBIL can be used for self-study as well as for tutor-based language teaching sessions. With the help of the Offline programmes (with links to the web) students can prepare themselves for studying abroad and coping with everyday situations in the host country.

EUROMOBIL programmes and language levels 
Target languages are Czech, English, Finnish, French, German, Hungarian, Polish, Portuguese and Romanian. The EUROMOBIL programmes have been designed on the basis of a needs analysis and in close collaboration with students. Consequently, the programmes for different languages differ in their levels, contents and target skills according to the specific needs of exchange students in the target country.

Programmes for beginner level 
Languages: Czech, Finnish, Hungarian, Polish, Portuguese, Romanian
Aims: information about target language and country, preparation for studying abroad and tools for coping with everyday situations
Country-specific contents: studies, services, leisure, library, (Finnish programme), travel book (Hungarian programme)
Activities: training in vocabulary and phrases, listening and reading comprehension, writing and speaking (Finnish programme), discussion exercises at the EUROMOBIL forum
English as supportive language

Programmes for advanced language learners 
Languages: English, French, German (activities for beginner and intermediate language learners in the French programme)
Aims: tools for following university courses  in the language of the country with ease
Country-specific contents: study advice, lecture, seminar, exam (German and English programme); arrival at university, during your stay, exams and departure (French programme)
Activities: listening comprehension, training in vocabulary and interaction strategies, evaluation of oral communication and discussion (at the EUROMOBIL forum), writing and speaking
Unilingual

Programmes for beginner level include a variety of audio and short video recordings. The activities for advanced language learners are based on authentic and semi-authentic video recordings that focus on the training of oral communication skills.

References

External links 
 The official website of the project

Higher education organisations based in Europe
Language education materials
Information technology organizations based in Europe